Balakend or Balakənd may refer to:
 Dovekh, Armenia
Balakend, Gadabay, Azerbaijan
Balakend, Saatly, Azerbaijan
Balakənd, Sabirabad, Azerbaijan